Louise Eileen Staley (born 9 August 1965) is an Australian politician. She was elected as Liberal Party member of the Victorian Legislative Assembly in November 2014, representing the Legislative Assembly seat of Ripon until her defeat in 2022.

Staley variously served as the Shadow Treasurer, Shadow Minister for Roads and Shadow Minister for Transport Infrastructure.

Early life
Staley attended Korowa Anglican Girls School, graduating in 1982. She then attended Melbourne University, where she completed her Bachelor of Arts. While at university, Staley was involved in student politics.

Staley completed a Post Graduate Diploma in Applied Finance from the Securities Institute, a Post Graduate Diploma in Finance from Melbourne University, a Chartered Financial Analyst accreditation through the CFA Institute USA and a Masters in Public Policy at Flinders University.

Early career
Following a career in finance, Louise joined her partner Stephen at Willaura, where they farmed cereals and canola. In 2007, Staley called for reform to the wheat industry’s single desk system.

Staley has held several positions, including serving as President of the East Grampians Health Service.

Staley was also a director of the Grampians Medicare Local and a director of Networking Health Victoria and a Director of the Food and Environment Unit at the Institute of Public Affairs.

Staley was previously convicted of drink driving in 2000 with a blood alcohol content of twice the legal limit. Staley was subsequently accused of covering up the crime from the Liberal Party when seeking pre-selection for the seat of Menzies, an accusation denied by Staley.

Political career
Louise Staley became a member of the Liberal Party in 1985 and has held various positions within the party since, including as State Vice President from 1996 until 2000.

Staley was elected as the Liberal Party member for Ripon in November 2014. She was re-elected in the November 2018 election by just 15 votes, the closest result of that election.

Staley was defeated at the 2022 Victorian state election after eight years in Opposition.

References

External links

 Parliamentary voting record of Louise Staley at Victorian Parliament Tracker

1965 births
Living people
Liberal Party of Australia members of the Parliament of Victoria
Members of the Victorian Legislative Assembly
University of Melbourne alumni
21st-century Australian politicians
Women members of the Victorian Legislative Assembly
CFA charterholders
21st-century Australian women politicians